Tours Cathedral is a Roman Catholic church located in Tours, Indre-et-Loire, France, and dedicated to Saint Gatianus. It is the seat of the Archbishops of Tours, the metropolitan cathedral of the Tours ecclesiastical province. It was built between 1170 and 1547. At the time construction began, the church was located at the south end of the bridge over the river Loire, on the road from Paris to the south-west of France. It has been a classified monument historique since 1862. Since 1905 it has been owned by the French State, with the Catholic Church having the exclusive rights of use.

History

Three earlier cathedrals existed on the same site. The first, dedicated to Saint Maurice, was built by Bishop Lidorius from 337 to 371.  It burned in 558, and was rebuilt by the Bishop Gregory of Tours and rededicated it in 590.  Its location, at the south-west angle of the castrum, or old Roman walls, resulted in the cathedral entrance being part of the old Roman city wall.  Beginning in about 1160  another structure was begun, in the Angevin style. It was badly damaged by a fire, and never finished.

The work recommenced with the choir in about 1220, and received financial assistance in from Louis IX, or Saint Louis. The choir and transept were rebuilt between 1240 and the beginning of the 14th century, using portions of the lower walls of the Romanesque structure. The lower portions were largely in the early Gothic style, the upper walls in the later Rayonnant style. At the end of the 14th century, the transept was completed.  In 1356, the cathedral was re-dedicated to Saint Gatianus.

Further work and the construction of the towers was interrupted by the Hundred Years War (1337-1453). The nave was only finished during the 15th century by architects Jean de Dammartin, Jean Papin and Jean Durand. with financial assistance from Charles VII and the Duke of Brittany Jean V.  In 1484 the lower portals were completed. The two new towers were erected just outside of the old city walls.  The late-Roman surrounding wall is visible in cross section at the rear of the towers from the north. The first tower was finished in 1534 and the second in 1547, with French Renaissance features in their crowns.

The very slow construction of the cathedral led to a local saying: "... not until the cathedral is finished", to mean something particularly long and difficult to achieve. It also meant that the building presents a complex pattern of French religious types of architecture from the 13th century to the 16th.

In 1787, responding to Vatican doctrines calling for making interiors of churches more open and welcoming, the jubé, or choir screen, which separated the choir from the nave, was removed.  In 1793, during the French Revolution, the Jacobins smashed the statues on the church portal. The church was nationalised and transformed into a Temple of Reason, until the reign of Napoleon I.  In 1848, portions of the cathedral, including the portal sculpture, were restored.

A major restoration of the cathedral began in 1993. The organ restoration was completed in 1996, and began of the upper windows, Between 2010 and 2013 the restoration of the north transept and is rose window was completed, restored, and two hundred square meters of new windows, dedicated to Saint Martin, were added to cathedral. A new main altar was dedicated in 2018.

Architecture

The Exterior - West Front 

The west front of the cathedral displays three very different styles of architecture harmoniously combined. The lower walls of the towers and the central block of the facade up to the triangular fronton date were built in sober Romanesque style, then, along with the buttresses, were covered with much more ornate and dense Flamboyant decoration.

Transepts and chevet 

The sides of the cathedral are reinforced with massive flying buttresses, capped with spires to give them additional weight. The chevet of the cathedral, at the east end, is very unusual along Gothic cathedrals in not having any other structures attached to it.

The north transept of the cathedral is unusual in that it has two additional buttresses to support the north front, with its rose window. The rose window also has an unusual bar attached to its face to give it additional strength.

Towers 

The two towers have heights of 69 and 70 meters. Portions of the bases of the towers date to the 12th century, The faces of the towers are covered with very elaborate tracery and decoration in the later Flamboyant style. The top sections of the two towers, which completed the structures, with heights of 69 and 70 meters, are early examples of  French Renaissance architecture.

Interior  

The nave has the traditional three levels; a gallery on the ground floor with large pillars supporting the ribs of the vaulted ceiling; a mid-level gallery, or triforium, with windows; and an upper level, or clerestory, with tall windows filling the upper walls with glass. The nave has a height of 29 meters, but a width less than many cathedrals, probably due to the re-use of an earlier Romanesque foundation.  The vaults are covered with the original roof structure, built of wooden beams from the 13th century in the choir, and from the 15th century in the nave.

The choir still has its original fifteen 13th-century windows, which feature both scenes of the lives of  Christ, Apostles and Saints, as well as windows which depict the professions of the guilds which contributed to the financing of the windows. The rose window in the north transept, built in the early 14th century, has an unusual design. It was placed into the center of a square already filled with stained glass. This later caused difficulties of stability; a buttress had to be built in the interior, across the middle of the window, which divides it into two.  The window is also supported by flying buttresses on the outside.

The south transept also has a rose window, and contains the original case of the 16th century organ, It was donated by Martin de Beaune, and built by Barnabé Delanoue. It now contains an 18th-century organ built by Cliquot.

Art and Decoration 

The nave contains a monumental tomb, that of the two children of King Charles VIII of France and Anne of Brittany, who died as infants. It was made in 1506 by Guillaume Regnault or Girolamo da Fiesole, and originally was located in the church of St. Martin, and was moved to the cathedral after the French Revolution. The tomb is made of Carrara marble,  in the Italian style. The recumbent statues are reminiscent of the 15th-century French medieval tradition (school of Michel Colombe).

Stained glass 

In the 13th century, the artists working on Tours Cathedral launched a small revolution in the design of stained glass windows. Instead of having the entire window filled a multitude of small scenes made of tiny pieces of deeply-coloured glass, the Tours artists began making windows with a mixture of types of glass; the traditional iconographic scenes with Biblical figures were surrounded by panes of clear or lightly coloured glass decorated with ornamental and vegetal themes. This served the purpose of bringing a much greater quantity of light into the interior, and also highlighted the chosen subjects, which otherwise were lost among hundreds of other images. This style of window, introduced at Tours in  about 1265, was soon followed at Troyes Cathedral, and then spread quickly to other cathedrals in France and then England.

This revolution in the format of display was accompanied by an even more important revolution in technique, with the use of silver stain, a method for painting onto glass with enamel paints, which were then heated and fused onto the glass. This allowed the more expressive figures, shading and three-dimensions, closer to paintings than to mosaics. The sizes of the pieces of glass became larger, and the amount of lead bars in the window smaller. The figures in stained glass windows began to resemble those in medieval miniature paintings in realism.

Rose windows

The cathedral has three rose windows in the west front and the two ends of the transept. The most original is that of the north transept, installed in the beginning of the 14th century. The rose was installed in a square section of window already filled with glass. where the rose was installed, problems of stability appeared, and it had to be reinforced by a vertical stone bar behind the window, dividing it in two,  and by additional buttresses on the exterior.

Pipe Organ

The pipe organ is located in the south transept.  The case and decoration date to the 16th century. The  instrument now in place was made in the 18th century by the family firm founded by Robert Clicquot.

Bells
The cathedral has four major bells located in the south tower. The bourdon, the largest and deepest-sounding, is Christus, made in 1749 and weighing 1900 kilos. It originally hung in the nearby Abbey of St. Paul in Cormery. In 1793, during the Revolution, most church bells were seized and melted down to make cannon and other armament. Towns were allowed to have only a single bell to warn of a fire. The inhabitants of Coermery resisted and rolled the bell to another town to preserve i. Finally, in 1807, it was taken to Tours and installed in the tower.

The other three bells are:
Maurice (1350 kilos, 1864); 
Gatien (980 kilos, 1884),
Martin (310 kilos, 14th century

The Cloister of La Psalette and the Archbishop's Palace 

To the north of the cathedral is a small cloister, built during the Renaissance, known as the cloître de la Psalette, in reference to its function as a school where the chanting of psalms was taught. It was built between 1442 and 1524. It has three galleries, placed against the north wall of the cathedral. It also has a scriptorium, where manuscripts were created, which was built in 1520, and is served by a stairway; and a library with a vaulted ceiling, where several frescoes from the 13th and 14th centuries can be seen. This was an early appearance of the French Renaissance style, which had recently been introduced in the stairway the Chateau of Blois in the nearby Loire Valley.

To the south of the cathedral is the former archbishop's palace, built in the early 18th century, which has now become the Musée des Beaux-Arts de Tours. It also was originally built against the GaLLO-Roman city wall of the 4th century. It contains one hall from the 11th century, and another from the 12th century. On the wall of the second hall is a balcony from which the judgements of the ecclesiastical court were announced.

Burials
 Archibald Douglas, 4th Earl of Douglas, Duke of Touraine, buried with his son, Sir James Douglas in the Choir, following the Battle of Verneuil 1424.

Gallery

See also
List of Gothic Cathedrals in Europe
 Pierre Camille Le Moine

Notes and Citations

Bibliography

External links

  Structurae.de
  Gotik-Romanik.de - photos and plan of the cathedral
  plan, detailed photographs in color
  Cathédrale Saint-Gatien à Tours - patrimoine-histoire.fr

Churches in Indre-et-Loire
Buildings and structures in Tours, France
Gothic architecture in France
Monuments of the Centre des monuments nationaux
Roman Catholic cathedrals in France